Isaac Koné (born 3 January 1991) is an Ivorian footballer who plays as a central midfielder for Ionikos.

Club career
Koné trained at Monaco's youth academy and played in the youth level. Following Monaco relegated to Ligue 2 in the 2010–11 Ligue 1, he got a chance to play in the senior squad. However, he was released from his side after the 2011–12 season.

In July 2012, he joined Championnat National side Fréjus Saint-Raphaël.

International career 
He debuts with Ivory Coast U23 on 11 October 2011 against Morocco (0-2).

Honours
Ionikos
Super League Greece 2: 2020–21

References

External links
 
 

1991 births
Living people
Footballers from Paris
Ivorian footballers
Ivory Coast under-20 international footballers
French footballers
French sportspeople of Ivorian descent
Ivorian expatriate footballers
Association football defenders
Ligue 2 players
Belgian Pro League players
Challenger Pro League players
AS Monaco FC players
ÉFC Fréjus Saint-Raphaël players
RWS Bruxelles players
Royal Antwerp F.C. players
Cercle Brugge K.S.V. players
Expatriate footballers in Belgium
Expatriate footballers in Monaco